Hugh Allen Harper (December 24, 1885 – August 8, 1963) was a member of the Wisconsin State Assembly.

Biography
Harper was born on Christmas Eve of 1885 in Lancaster, Wisconsin. He graduated from the University of Wisconsin–Madison in 1908 and served in the National Guard of the United States. He served on the school, town, and county boards. While at the University of Wisconsin, Harper played basketball for the Badgers and was retroactively named an All-American for his senior season of 1907–08.

He died in Lancaster on August 8, 1963.

Political career
Harper was a member of the Assembly on three occasions. First from 1931 to 1936, second, from 1945 to 1952 and third, from 1957 to 1963. He was a Republican.

References

1885 births
1963 deaths
20th-century American politicians
All-American college men's basketball players
American men's basketball players
Basketball players from Wisconsin
County supervisors in Wisconsin
Military personnel from Wisconsin
People from Lancaster, Wisconsin
School board members in Wisconsin
Wisconsin Badgers men's basketball players
Wisconsin city council members
United States Army soldiers
Republican Party members of the Wisconsin State Assembly